David Guest (6 January 1911– 28 July 1938) was a British mathematician and philosopher who volunteered to fight for the Republicans in the Spanish Civil War and was killed in Spain in 1938. He was the uncle of American-British musician, actor and director Christopher Guest.

Biography
Guest was the son of Leslie Haden-Guest (created 1st Baron Haden-Guest in 1950). He entered Trinity College, Cambridge, in 1929 and studied from 1930 to 1931 in Göttingen in Germany, where he was sentenced to two weeks in prison for anti-Nazi political activity. On his return he joined the Communist Party at Cambridge in 1931. There Guest became the head of a party cell that included John Cornford, Guy Burgess, Donald Maclean, Victor Kiernan and James Klugmann. This enabled dons such as Maurice Dobb and John Bernal to take a back-seat. It was claimed that David Guest would "stride into hall at Trinity wearing a hammer and sickle pin in his lapel."

In 1933, after leaving Cambridge Guest moved to Battersea, South London, where he lectured in mathematics and worked for the Communist party at the Peoples' Bookshop in Lavender Hill. He soon became active in Battersea Young Communist League. While working at the bookshop he joined the shop workers union. In May 1935, he organised a Youth Peace Parade of fifty young people, some dressed as nurses, others with gas masks and with stretchers, to warn of war. For a short period of time he taught at a secondary school for English-speaking children in Moscow, but returned to England to lecture at University College in Southampton.

In 1938 he left his post as a lecturer at University College to volunteer for the International Brigades fighting in Spain. He wrote of his decision:
Today we have certainly entered a period of crisis, when the arguments of 'normal times' no longer apply, when considerations of most immediate usefulness come in. That is why I have decided to take the opportunity of going to Spain.
Guest arrived in Spain on 31 March 1938 and joined the British Battalion of the International Brigades. The Battalion went into action at the Battle of the Ebro which began on 25 July 1938. Three days later, on 28 July, Guest was killed on Hill 481 at Gandesa by a sniper as he read a newspaper.

After his death, notes he had made while lecturing at the Marx Memorial Workers' School were published as A Text Book of Dialectical Materialism in 1939.

Publications
Guest, David, (1939) A Text Book of Dialectical Materialism, Lawrence And Wishart (republished as Lectures on Marxist Philosophy (1963))

References

External links

Further reading
 Guest, Carmel Hayden (1939) David Guest – A Scientist Fights For Freedom 1911–1938, Lawrence and Wishart.

1911 births
1938 deaths
20th-century British mathematicians
Alumni of Trinity College, Cambridge
British Jews
British Marxists
British people of the Spanish Civil War
Communist Party of Great Britain members
International Brigades personnel
Jewish philosophers
Jewish socialists
Military personnel killed in the Spanish Civil War
David
20th-century British philosophers